Sinful Debt 2 is a 2010 Chinese television drama and the sequel of the 1995 hit series Sinful Debt. Again created by novelist Ye Xin, the story follows the same 5 children of sent-down youths—no longer teens but young adults nearing 30, as they establish careers and relationships in a post-modern world. Close to a dozen veteran actors repeated their memorable roles, but the 5 main characters were all portrayed by new actors.

Filming began in March 2009 in Shanghai. Part of the story is set in Myanmar close to the China–Myanmar border, and scenes were filmed on the border in both Tengchong and Ruili. 
The series was first broadcast locally on Shanghai's East Movie Channel on January 10, 2010, exactly 1 day after the 15th anniversary of the original series. It was broadcast nationally on Xinjiang Television in 2011. Inevitably compared to the successful original series, the sequel was overwhelmingly considered disappointing.

Cast and characters

Returning characters
Italics denote actors reprising their roles from Sinful Debt
Yao Di as Shen Meixia
Zhao Youliang as Shen Ruochen
Yan Xiaopin as Mei Yunqing
Li Chenjie as Shen Yang (Yangyang)
Shen Guangwei as Shen Guanchen
Zhai Tianlin as Liang Sifan
Wu Mian as Ling Shanshan
Chen Xuming as Liang Mancheng
Zhang Mo as Sheng Tianhua
Tu Ruying as Yu Leyin
Chi Huaqiong as Ma Yumin
Cao Kunqi as Ma Chaojun
Tan Zengwei as Tu Yingde
Zhang Linxiong as Sheng Jiawei
Ji Ning as Lu Xiaofeng
Li Jiayao as Lu Pinsan
Du Jiang as An Yonghui
Wu Jing as Yang Shaoquan
Wang Huaying as Wu Guanchao
Zhang Xiaoming as Han Ping
Song Ge as Ningning
Xiao Shumin as An Wenjiang

New characters
Allen Ting as Lin Miao
Luo Wei as Shang Miya
Wei Lai as Su Rourou
Wan Yang as Song Biyu
Wang Weiwei as Lu Xiaozhou
Gu Yan as Shang Haili
Zhu Manfang as Shang Haili's mother
Shi Tianshuo as Cheng Shanshan

References

2010 Chinese television series debuts
2010 Chinese television series endings
Television shows set in Shanghai
Television shows set in Myanmar
Television shows filmed in Shanghai
Television shows filmed in Yunnan
Mandarin-language television shows
Wu-language television shows
Chinese drama television series
Sequel television series
Television shows set in Anhui